Svolvær Church is a parish church of the Church of Norway in Vågan Municipality in Nordland county, Norway. It is located in the town of Svolvær on the island of Austvågøya. It is the main church for the Svolvær parish which is part of the Lofoten prosti (deanery) in the Diocese of Sør-Hålogaland. The white, concrete church was built in a long church style in 1934 using plans drawn up by the architects Harald Sund and August Nielsen. The church seats about 400 people.

Media gallery

See also
List of churches in Sør-Hålogaland

References

Vågan
Churches in Nordland
20th-century Church of Norway church buildings
Churches completed in 1934
1934 establishments in Norway
Long churches in Norway
Concrete churches in Norway